They Do Return...But Gently Lead Them Back is a short story collection written by Singaporean writer Catherine Lim, first published in 1983 by Times Edition Pte Ltd. The theme is on the supernatural and the paranormal.

Plot summaries
"The Old Man In The Balcony": Knockings on a coffin remind an old man that he is about to die, but he refuses to heed its call.
"A Boy Named Ah Mooi": A boy is given a girl's name so that he can escape the attentions of malignant ghouls.
"The Legacy": An old man, Ah Hoe Peh, fights death in the evening so as to bequeath a legacy of surplus to his sons.
"The Story of Father Monet": A devout Catholic priest is suspected of hanky-panky with a submissive Chinese wife when she gives birth to an albino child.
"Grandfather's Story": Grandfather tells a tale of karmic rebirth which makes him a mortal enemy of his lawful wife.
"Of Moles and Buttocks": Moles on the right place give fortune, but a wife's flat, fleshless buttocks will bring no luck to her husband.
"Full Moon": Superstition cautions one against pointing at a full moon.
"The Anniversary": A devoted lover believes a dead fiancée will return during her death anniversary.
"The Exhumation": The exhumation of graves for a country's development leads to the return of a dead grandmother, or it is so believed.
"Of Blood from Woman": The emission from a woman's menstruation is said to make a powerful love potion.
"Lee Geok Chan": A young girl student dies before her English examinations, but still manages to write an out-of-point essay for the Cambridge Syndicate. 
"Two Male Children": Two children swap fates as two mothers fight to keep their male offspring alive.
"A Soldier Stalks": A specter of a dead Japanese soldier causes paranormal activities in a quaint colonial house.
"They Do Return...But Gently Lead Them Back": Spirits are said to return to haunt the living but they can be led back gently to their final abodes.
"K.C.": A close friend dies of cancer but his admonishment to open his letter only a year after his death is left unheeded by the author.

References

1983 short story collections
Singaporean short story collections
Speculative fiction short story collections